Moody Nolan is based in Columbus, Ohio and is the largest African-American owned and operated architecture firm in the United States. In 2021, it was the recipient of The American Institute of Architects (AIA) Architecture Firm Award. The firm provides services to residences, commercial buildings, retail, sports, hospitals and cultural institutions.

Founded by architect Curt Moody and engineer Howard E. Nolan in 1983 with the distinct goal of developing a portfolio of private-sector projects unlike other minority firms. The firm has 12 office locations and 230 employees. In 2014, the civil engineering practice split off to form Moody Engineering. In 2018, the firm founded the Legacy House Project, which annually gifts a house to a family in need.

In 2020, Curt Moody's son, Jonathan Moody, became the CEO.

Awards 
 2000 National Organization of Minority Architects’ (NOMA) Firm of the Year
 2021 AIA Architecture Firm Award

See also
 Atlanta Central Library

References

External links 
 

Architecture firms based in Ohio
Companies based in the Columbus, Ohio metropolitan area